Bradley James may refer to:

 Bradley James, English actor
 Bradley S. James, United States Marine Corps general
 Brad James, American actor
 Bradley James, British songwriter who wrote song "Something Outa Nothing" for EastEnders

See also
 James Bradley (disambiguation)